Maggie MacInnes (born 29 August 1963 in Glasgow, Scotland) is a Scottish folk singer and clàrsach player, who performs primarily in Scottish Gaelic. She is the daughter of two Barra-natives; lawyer Alister MacInnes and legendary Gaelic folk singer Flora MacNeil.

Discography

Solo albums
 Cairistìona (1984) – with George Jackson of Ossian
 Eilean Mara (Island in the Sea) (1998)
 Spiorad Beatha (The Spirit of Life) (2001)
 Peaceful Ground (Talamh Sìtheil) (2004)
 Òran Na Mnà (A Woman's Song) (2006)
 Leaving Mingulay (A Fàgail Mhiughalaigh) (2009)
 The Seedboat (Bàta an t-Sìl) (2010) – with Colum Sands
 [https://www.maggiemacinnes.co.uk/recordings/port-ban/ Port Bàn (2020)]

Collaborations and guest appearances
 Hamish Moore & Dick Lee – The Bees Knees (1991)
 Flora MacNeil – Orain Floraidh (1993)
 Donald Black – Keil Road (2007)

References 

1963 births
Living people
Scottish folk singers
Musicians from Glasgow
Scottish Gaelic singers